Caleana terminalis, commonly known as smooth-billed duck orchid is a species of orchid endemic to a small area near the Murchison River in the south-west of Western Australia. It has a single smooth leaf and usually only a single greenish yellow and red flower. It is distinguished by its slightly humped labellum, with calli only on its outer one fifth.

Description 
Unlike those of most other caleanas, the leaf is not withered at flowering time. The dorsal sepal, lateral sepals and petals are narrow and hang downwards with the dorsal sepal pressed against the column which has broad wings, forming a bucket-like shape. About one fifth of the outer part of the labellum is covered with glossy black glands or calli and the labellum has a slightly humped top. Flowering occurs in August and September.

Taxonomy and naming 
The smooth-billed duck orchid was first formally described in 2006 by Stephen Hopper and Andrew Brown who gave it the name Paracaleana terminalis. The description was published in Australian Systematic Botany from a specimen collected from the Z Bend in the Murchison River Gorge near Kalbarri. In 2014, based on molecular studies, Joseph Miller and Mark Clements transferred all the species previously in Paracaleana to Caleana so that the present species became Caleana terminalis. The specific epithet (terminalis) is a Latin word meaning "of ends or boundaries", referring to the callus being confined to the very tip of the labellum.

Distribution and habitat 
Caleana terminalis grows in sandy soil in shrubland between the Pinjarega Nature Reserve and Nerren Nerren station in the  Geraldton Sandplains biogeographic region.

Conservation
Caleana terminalis (as Paracaleana terminalis) is classified as "not threatened" by the Western Australian Government Department of Parks and Wildlife.

References

External links

terminalis
Orchids of Western Australia
Endemic orchids of Australia
Plants described in 2006
Endemic flora of Western Australia